The Stó꞉lō Tribal Council is a First Nations Tribal Council in the Fraser Valley-Greater Vancouver region of the Canadian province of British Columbia. It includes Stó꞉lō First Nations band governments located geographically from Hope, at the south end of the Fraser Canyon, down to Langley.  

The Sto꞉lo Nation Chiefs Council has different band members. Several Sto꞉lo peoples and their band governments do not belong to either council.

Member governments
Chawathil First Nation
Cheam First Nation
Kwaw-kwaw-Apilt First Nation
Sq'éwlets First Nation
Seabird Island First Nation
Shxw'ow'hamel First Nation 	
Soowahlie First Nation

Source: Indian and Northern Affairs Canada information page

See also
Sto꞉lo Nation Chiefs Council
Stó꞉lō
Halkomelem
List of tribal councils in British Columbia

External links
 Stó꞉lō Tribal Council website 

Sto:lo
First Nations tribal councils in British Columbia
Lower Mainland